Hovhannes Mkrtchyan (born October 8, 1991 in Yerevan, Armenia) is an Armenian figure skater. He is the 2005 Armenian national silver medalist. Mkrtchyan trains in Lake Arrowhead, California and is coached by Rafael Arutyunyan.

Competitive highlights

 J = Junior level

External links
 

Armenian figure skaters
1991 births
Living people
Sportspeople from Yerevan